Matlan Marjan is a former professional football player from the state of Sabah, Malaysia. He is renowned for scoring 2 goals against England for Malaysia in a friendly match on 12 June 1991, the only Malaysian to have done so. He has a younger brother, Zainizam Marjan who also played for Sabah FA and Malaysia.

Matlan is a Sabahan Bajau from Kota Belud, Sabah. He started his professional career by playing in the Presidents Cup. He made his M-League debut in 1989 season by scoring 5 league goals. In 1990 season, he scored 8 (6 league and 2 
FA cup goals) of Sabah FA total 16 goals.

In 1991, Matlan earned his first call-up for the national team for a friendly match with Aston Villa. On 12 June 1991, he made his full international debut against England as he equalled the 35-year record of Toni Fritsch as the latest new cap to score twice against England.

In 1995, he made history by becoming the first player from Sabah to captain the national team selection in the match against Flamengo XI.

In the same year, Matlan, along with five other Sabah FA players, was arrested on suspicion of match-fixing scandal. Although the charges against the six were dropped he was severely punished, thus ending his football career. He was banished to another district.

Honours

Sabah

 Malaysia FA Cup: 1995; runner-up 1994

Individual
 Sabah FA top scorer: 1990

References 

1968 births
Living people
Bajau people
People from Sabah
Sabah F.C. (Malaysia) players
Association football forwards
Malaysian footballers
Malaysia international footballers
People from Kota Belud District